The 1996 Detroit Lions season was their 67th in the National Football League (NFL). The team declined severely from their previous season’s output of 10–6. Following a 4–2 start, the Lions would proceed to lose nine of their final ten games to finish 5–11, missing the playoffs for the first time in four seasons.

Following the season, longtime head coach Wayne Fontes was fired and Bobby Ross was hired to be the team's head coach the following season.

Offseason

NFL Draft 

Notes

 Detroit received San Diego's first-round selection (21st) in exchange for Detroit's second-round selection in 1995.
 Detroit traded up from the pick it received from San Diego (21st) with Seattle to the 17th pick, giving up a third-round selection (91st) in return. The 91st pick was received from Kansas City in exchange for S William White.
 Detroit traded its second- and seventh-round selections (55th and 236th) to Denver in exchange for RB Glyn Milburn.
 Detroit traded up from its third-round selection (86th) with New England to the Patriots' third-round selection (76th), giving up its fourth- and sixth-round selections (119th and 195th).

Personnel

Staff

Roster

Regular season

Schedule 
1996 was the first time since 1984 that the Lions played the San Diego Chargers, and the first time they had met the Philadelphia Eagles in the regular season since 1986. The reason for this is that before the admission of the Texans in 2002, NFL scheduling formulas for games outside a team’s division were much more influenced by table position during the previous season.

Standings

References

External links 
 1996 Detroit Lions at Pro-Football-Reference.com

Detroit Lions seasons
Detroit Lions
Detroit Lions